4791 Iphidamas  is a Jupiter trojan from the Trojan camp, approximately  in diameter. It was discovered on 14 August 1988, by American astronomer Carolyn Shoemaker at the Palomar Observatory in California. The dark Jovian asteroid belongs the 100 largest Jupiter trojans and has a rotation period of 9.7 hours. It was named after the Trojan warrior Iphidamas, from Greek mythology.

Orbit and classification 

Iphidamas is a dark Jupiter trojan in a 1:1 orbital resonance with Jupiter. It is located in the trailering Trojan camp at the Gas Giant's  Lagrangian point, 60° behind its orbit . It is also a non-family asteroid of the Jovian background population.

It orbits the Sun at a distance of 4.9–5.4 AU once every 11 years and 9 months (4,281 days; semi-major axis of 5.16 AU). Its orbit has an eccentricity of 0.05 and an inclination of 26° with respect to the ecliptic. The body's observation arc begins with its official discovery observation at Palomar in August 1988.

Physical characteristics 

Iphidamas is an assumed, carbonaceous C-type asteroid. It has a high V–I color index of 1.03 (see table below).

Rotation period 

In 2014 and 2015, two rotational lightcurves of Iphidamas were obtained from photometric observations by Robert Stephens at the Center for Solar System Studies in Landers, California. Analysis of the best-rated lightcurve from December 2015 showed a rotation period of  hours with a brightness amplitude of 0.31 magnitude, superseding a previous period determination by Stefano Mottola at the La Silla Observatory from February 1992, which gave a similar period of 9.57 hours.

Diameter and albedo 

According to the surveys carried out by the NEOWISE mission of NASA's Wide-field Infrared Survey Explorer, the Infrared Astronomical Satellite IRAS, and the Japanese Akari satellite, Iphidamas measures between 49.528 and 59.96 kilometers in diameter and its surface has an albedo between 0.055 and 0.079. The Collaborative Asteroid Lightcurve Link derives an albedo of 0.0483 and a diameter of 57.74 kilometers based on an absolute magnitude of 10.1.

Naming 

This minor planet was named from Greek mythology after the Trojan warrior Iphidamas, son of Theano and Antenor, who was the counselor of King Priam. During the Trojan War, he confronted Agamemnon in battle, but his spear bent against Agamemnon's war belt, who then killed Iphidamas with his sword. The official naming citation was published by the Minor Planet Center on 27 June 1991.

Notes

References

External links 
 Asteroid Lightcurve Database (LCDB), query form (info )
 Dictionary of Minor Planet Names, Google books
 Discovery Circumstances: Numbered Minor Planets (1)-(5000) – Minor Planet Center
 Asteroid 4791 Iphidamas at the Small Bodies Data Ferret
 
 

004791
Discoveries by Carolyn S. Shoemaker
Named minor planets
19880814